Calcagno is an Italian type of pecorino cheese prepared using raw sheep milk and peppercorns. It is a hard cheese that can be grated. In its preparation, peppercorns are added to the curd, the mixture is drained in baskets, salt is added, and the mix is then aged for at least three months. As the cheese ages, it becomes more grainy in texture, and its flavor becomes spicier, more pungent and saltier. Calcagno originated in Sardinia, and is prepared in Sardinia and Sicily. It is sometimes aged for up to ten months.

See also

 List of Italian cheeses

References

External links
 Calcagno. Cheese.com

Sardinian cheeses